Chi-hwa-seon or Chwi-hwa-seon, (also known as Painted Fire, Strokes of Fire or Drunk on Women and Poetry), is a 2002 South Korean drama film directed by Im Kwon-taek about Jang Seung-eop (commonly known by his pen name, Owon), a nineteenth-century Korean painter who changed the direction of Korean art.

Synopsis
It begins with the Korean artist being suspicious of a Japanese art-lover who values his work.  The story then goes back to his man's early years. Beginning as a vagabond with a talent for drawing, he has a talent for imitating other people's art, but is urged to go on and develop a style of his own.  This process is painful and he often behaves very badly, getting drunk and being hostile to those who care about him and try to help him.

These events are set against the struggle for reform within Korea, caught between China and Japan (annexed by Japan in 1910, outside the film's time-frame).

Cast
 Choi Min-sik as Jang Seung-up
 Ahn Sung-ki as Kim Byung-Moon
 Yoo Ho-jeong as Mae-hyang
 Kim Yeo-jin as Jin-jong
 Son Ye-jin as So-woon

Awards 

 In 2020, the film was ranked by The Guardian number 13 among the classics of modern South Korean cinema.

References

Sources 
 Distributor's page

External links 
 
 Review at koreanfilm.org

2002 films
2002 biographical drama films
South Korean historical drama films
South Korean biographical drama films
Biographical films about painters
Films set in the 19th century
Films set in the Joseon dynasty
Films shot in Incheon
Films directed by Im Kwon-taek
Best Picture Blue Dragon Film Award winners
2000s Korean-language films
Cultural depictions of South Korean men
Cultural depictions of 19th-century painters
2000s historical drama films
Japan in non-Japanese culture
2000s South Korean films